Calotes grandisquamis, the large-scaled forest lizard, is an arboreal, diurnal, insectivorous agamid lizard found in the evergreen rainforests of the Western Ghats of India; distributed from Agumbe to Agasthyamalai Hills.

Gallery

References

 Boulenger, G.A. 1885 Catalogue of the Lizards in the British Museum (Nat. Hist.) I. Geckonidae, Eublepharidae, Uroplatidae, Pygopodidae, Agamidae.  London: 450 pp.
 Ganesh, S. R.; S. R. Chandramouli 2013. Identification of Two Similar Indian Agamid Lizards Calotes nemoricola Jerdon, 1853 and C.grandisquamis Günther, 1875. Russ. J. Herpetol. 20 (1): 33–35.

External links

 Pictures of Calotes grandisquamis http://www.kalyanvarma.net/photo.php?id=1158&tag=portfolio

Calotes
Reptiles of India
Endemic fauna of the Western Ghats
Reptiles described in 1875
Taxa named by Albert Günther